Steve Deger is an American author of inspirational nonfiction books. He is the co-creator of the best-selling Positive Quotations book series.

Biography
Deger grew up in Hibbing, Minnesota, where he worked as a journalist prior to finishing his undergraduate studies in mass communications and creative writing at St. Cloud State University. He has served in various positions for several leading independent publishers, including editor-in-chief for Llewellyn Publications and acquisitions manager for Fairview Press. He is the former president of the Minnesota Book Publishers' Roundtable.

Books
The Book of Positive Quotations, 2nd Ed. Fairview Press, 2007. .
The Little Book of Positive Quotations. Fairview Press, 2006. .
The Girl's Book of Positive Quotations. Fairview Press, 2008. .
The Boy's Book of Positive Quotations.  Fairview Press, 2009. .
The Nightly Book of Positive Quotations.  Fairview Press, 2009. .
"The Women's Book of Positive Quotations", 2nd Ed. Fairview Press, 2010. .

Also cited in
Jeff Herman's Guide to Book Publishers, Editors & Literary Agents 2009.
Literary MarketPlace 2009.
Publishers Weekly,  December 17, 2001. Interviewed in cover article by Robert Dahlin.
Publishers Weekly, 24 September 2007, Interviewed in cover article by Natalie Danford.
Writer's Market 2009.

External links

 LinkedIn.com
 JacketFlap.com

American male writers
People from Hibbing, Minnesota
Living people
Writers from Minnesota
Year of birth missing (living people)